Enemies of Society is a 1927 American silent film directed by Ralph Ince and starring Conway Tearle, Margaret Morris and Frankie Darro. It is also known by the alternative title of Moulders of Men.

Cast
 Conway Tearle as Dr. William Matthews  
 Margaret Morris as Anne Grey  
 Frankie Darro as Sandy Barry  
 Rex Lease as Jim Barry  
 Eugene Pallette as Barney Mulholland  
 Jola Mendez as Betty  
 William Knight as Detective Mailey

Preservation status
The film is preserved in the Euro archives, Cineteca Italiana (Milan) and Filmmuseum EYE Institute, Amsterdam, Netherlands.

References

Bibliography
 Quinlan, David. The Illustrated Guide to Film Directors. Batsford, 1983.

External links

1927 films
Films directed by Ralph Ince
American silent feature films
1920s English-language films
American black-and-white films
Films with screenplays by Dorothy Yost
Film Booking Offices of America films
1920s American films